Orivesi is a large lake located in the Northern Karelia region in Finland. The area of the lake is 601.30 km² (7th largest). Orivesi is one of the major basins of Saimaa. The lake has numerous islands and several open lake areas including Paasselkä, an ancient impact crater in south.

References

Saimaa